Antonio Menchaca Careaga (15 July 1921-2002) was a Spanish novelist and poet.  He was born at Las Arenas, province of Vizcaya, educated at Catholic institutions, Oxford University, and the University of Madrid. He had a maritime career at first but was committed to peace in the world. He is regarded as a liberal defender of democracy under the fascist dictatorship of Franco. After he signed a manifesto ("of the 500") against the Law of Succession to the Headship of the State in 1947, the navy expelled him. Thereafter he worked for a shipping company, while continuing to write.

Works

 Bandera negra (Black Flag). Ed. Plaza y Janés, Barcelona, 1964
 Mar de fondo (Sea of Background), novela, finalista Premio Nadal en 1965
 Las cenizas del esplendor (The Ashes of Splendour), Amor siempre asediado y La crisálida. Trilogía de novelas históricas que narran desde la guerra Carlista de 1870 hasta cien años después.
 Resucitar en Palermo (Resurrection in Palermo)
 La Rosa de los vientos. A historiographic work that tells the story of the Bodega y Quadra exploration.
 El camino de Roma (The Way of Rome) a travel book.
 Cara a España (Face to Spain).
 Bilbaíno en Londres (Bilbaino in London)
 Las horas decisivas. Memorias (The Decisive Hours). Ed. Espasa-Calpe, Madrid, 1992

References

1921 births
2002 deaths
Spanish novelists
Spanish poets
Alumni of the University of Oxford
Complutense University of Madrid alumni